Nathaniel Edward Kindersley (2 February 1763 – 16 February 1831) was an English civil service officer to the British East India Company. He is known for being the first translator of the Tirukkural into English in 1794.

Family
Nathaniel Edward Kindersley was born to Nathaniel Kindersley and Jemima Wickstead at Great Yarmouth, Norfolk, England. He married Hannah Butterworth on 3 July 1786 at Tangernaikpuram, Tamil Nadu, India, and they had two sons named Sir Richard Torin Kindersley (born 5 October 1792, died 22 October 1879) and Nathaniel William Kindersley (born 1794, died 3 December 1844).

He died on 16 February 1831 at the age of 68 at Little Marlow, Buckinghamshire, England.

Works
Nathaniel Edward Kindersley published the first ever translation of the Tirukkural into English in a chapter titled 'Extracts from the Teroo-Vaulaver Kuddul, or, The Ocean of Wisdom' in his publication Specimens of Hindoo Literature in 1794. However, he translated only the first few chapters of Book I of the Kural text in prose.

See also

 Tirukkural translations
 Tirukkural translations into English
 List of translators into English

References

Further reading
 Henry Davidson Love. (1913). Indian Records Series Vestiges of Old Madras 1640-1800 (4 vols.). New Delhi: Mittal Publications.
 N. E. Kindersley. (1794). Specimens of Hindoo Literature: Consisting of Translations, from the Tamoul Language, of Some Hindoo Works of Morality and Imagination, with Explanatory Notes. London: W. Bulmer and Company (sold by F. Wingrave, successor to Mr. Nourse). 335 pp.

Tamil–English translators
Translators of the Tirukkural into English
1763 births
1831 deaths
Nathaniel
Tirukkural translators
18th-century translators